Moses Fowler Odell (February 24, 1818 – June 13, 1866) was a two term U.S. Representative from New York during the American Civil War.

Biography
Born in Tarrytown, New York, Odell completed preparatory studies.
He was appointed entry clerk in the New York customhouse in 1845 and became public appraiser.

Congress 
Odell was elected as a Democrat to the Thirty-seventh and Thirty-eighth Congresses (March 4, 1861 – March 3, 1865).
He served as chairman of the Committee on Expenditures in the Department of the Treasury (Thirty-seventh Congress). 
He served on the United States Congress Joint Committee on the Conduct of the War during the American Civil War.

Later career and death 
He was appointed Navy agent at the city of New York in 1865 and served until his death in Brooklyn, New York, June 13, 1866.

He was interred in Greenwood Cemetery.

References

 Retrieved on 2009-5-13

1818 births
1866 deaths
Burials at Green-Wood Cemetery
People of New York (state) in the American Civil War
Democratic Party members of the United States House of Representatives from New York (state)
19th-century American politicians